Chimillas is a municipality in the province of Huesca, Spain. As of 2010, it has a population of 359 inhabitants.

Municipalities in the Province of Huesca